Loyal Bros (officially titled Only the Family – Lil Durk Presents: Loyal Bros) is a compilation album by American record label Only the Family. It was released on March 5, 2021, through the label alongside Empire Distribution. The album contains guest appearances from Lil Durk, late rapper King Von, Booka600, Memo600, Doodie Lo, THF Zoo, Lil Uzi Vert, Chief Wuk, Tee Grizzley, Big30, EST Gee, OTF Timo, Boss Top, C3, Slimelife Shawty, Jusblow600, Lil Mexico, Foogiano, OTF Ikey, Hypno Carlito, Boonie Moe, and Boona. It serves as the fourth compilation album by the label, following the 2019 compilation album, Family over Everything, a collaborative project with Durk. A sequel was released in collaboration with Durk on December 16, 2022.

Background
The album serves as the first project/compilation album by the record label to be released after one of its artists, American rapper King Von died from a shootout outside a nightclub in Atlanta, Georgia, on November 6, 2020. It is dedicated to him and is not the first time that Lil Durk has dedicated music to the late rapper, as some works include his sixth studio album, The Voice (2020), along with all the songs on the album, specifically the sixth track and their first posthumous collaboration, "Still Trappin'.

Release and promotion
On February 6, 2021, it was claimed that the album would reportedly be released on February 26, 2021. However, this was not the case, as Only the Family revealed its cover art on the rumored release date. On March 2, 2021, the label revealed the blurred track listing along with the announcement of the release of "Jump", performed by Lil Durk, King Von, and Booka600, featuring Memo600. The clear and official track listing was finally revealed the day before the album was released, March 4, 2021.

Singles
The album's lead single, "Me and Doodie Lo", with Doodie Lo and King Von, was released on August 21, 2020. The second single, "Streets Raised Me", with Doodie Lo and Booka600, was released on Black Friday, November 27, 2020. "Pull Up", with Doodie Lo and American rapper Timo, featuring American rapper C3 was released as the third single on January 15, 2021. Following it, the fourth single, "Rules", with Timo, was released on February 5, 2021. "Pistol Tottin", with American rapper Memo600, featuring American rapper Foogiano, was released as the sixth single on February 19, 2021. Finally, "Jump", performed by Lil Durk, King Von, and Booka600, featuring Memo600, was released as the sixth and final single on March 3, 2021.

Commercial performance
Loyal Bros debuted at number 12 on the US Billboard 200 chart, earning 28,000 album-equivalent units (including 2,000 copies in pure album sales) in its first week. The album also accumulated a total of 33.2 million on-demand streams of the album’s songs.

Track listing
Credits adapted from Tidal.

Personnel
Credits adapted from Tidal.

 Only the Family – primary artist 
 Lil Durk – primary artist 
 King Von – primary artist 
 Booka600 – primary artist 
 Memo600 – featured artist , primary artist 
 Doodie Lo – featured artist 
 Thf Zoo – featured artist , primary artist 
 Lil Uzi Vert – featured artist 
 Chief Wuk – primary artist 
 Tee Grizzley – primary artist 
 Big30 – featured artist 
 EST Gee – featured artist 
 Timo – primary artist 
 C3 – featured artist 
 Slimelife Shawty – primary artist 
 Jusblow600 – primary artist 
 Boss Top – primary artist 
 Lil Mexico – primary artist 
 Foogiano – featured artist 
 Ikey – primary artist 
 Hypno Carlito – primary artist 
 Boonie Mo – primary artist 
 Boona – featured artist

Charts

Weekly charts

Year-end charts

Release history

References

2021 compilation albums